Shugart may refer to:
Shugart Associates, computer peripheral manufacturer
Shugart bus, floppy disk drive interface
Alan Shugart, founder of Shugart Associates
Clyde Shugart, College and Professional American Football player
Kenneth Shugart, American naval officer and All-American college basketball player
Matthew Søberg Shugart, orchardist and professor of political science
Rita Shugart, American bridge player